The 1963 Montana Grizzlies football team represented the University of Montana in the 1963 NCAA College Division football season as a member of the first-year Big Sky Conference. Led by sixth-year head coach Ray Jenkins, the Grizzlies played their home games at Dornblaser Field and were 1–9 overall, 0–3 in conference.

The rivalry game with Idaho for the Little Brown Stein was not played this season or the following year.

Schedule

References

Montana
Montana Grizzlies football seasons
Montana Grizzlies football